A referendum was held in Transnistria on 1 December 1991, in which Transnistria voted to continue its de facto independence and seek international recognition as a separate, sovereign country and member of the international community.

97.7% of those who came to the polls opted for separation from Moldova.

In numbers, 372,027 people took part in the referendum. Of those, 363,647 people voted for independence of the Pridnestrovian Moldavian Republic.

International observers were invited, including representatives of the US State Department. However, only representatives of the St. Petersburg city council accepted the invitation to participate. In the conclusion of the observers, the referendum was an expression of the true will of  Transnistria's population. The United States, which did not avail itself of the invitation to watch the referendum, later expressed doubt about its veracity. Transnistria offered to hold it again, and indeed did so with the 2006 Transnistrian referendum.

References

External links
 History of creation and development of the Parliament of the Pridnestrovian Moldavian Republic (PMR)
 CEC data on referendum (Olvia Press - Official site)

Transnistria
Referendums in Transnistria
Separatism in Moldova
Transnistria, 1991 referendum
1991 elections in Moldova
1991 in Transnistria
1991 in international relations
Dissolution of the Soviet Union